Marika Nicolette Green (born 21 June 1943) is a Swedish-French actress.

Life and career
Green was born in Södermalm, Stockholm, Stockholm County, the daughter of a French mother, Jeanne Green-Le Flem, and Lennart Green, a Swedish journalist. Her paternal grandmother was the photographer Mia Green and her maternal grandfather was French composer and music critic Paul Le Flem. She left Sweden for France in 1953. She played the lead female role in Robert Bresson's Pickpocket at the age of 16.

She is the aunt of Eva Green and older sister of Walter Green, husband of Marlène Jobert. Green married Austrian cinematographer Christian Berger, regular collaborator of director Michael Haneke.

Filmography

 Pickpocket (1959) by Robert Bresson : Jeanne
 Le Récit de Rebecca (1964) by Paul Vecchiali
 Five Ashore in Singapore (1967) by Bernard Toublanc-Michel
 Le Golem (television - 1967) by Louis Pauwels and Jean Kerchbron
 Rider on the Rain (1969) by René Clément
 L'Affaire Crazy Capo (1973)
 Emmanuelle (1974) by Just Jaeckin : Bee
 Le Bal des voyous (1968) by  Jean-Claude Dague
 La Fille d'en face (1968) by Jean-Daniel Simon
 Until September (1984) by Richard Marquand
 Hanna en mer (1991) by Christian Berger

References

External links
 

1943 births
Living people
Actresses from Stockholm
Swedish film actresses
Swedish television actresses
Swedish voice actresses
French film actresses
French television actresses
French voice actresses
French video game actresses
Swedish emigrants to France
Swedish expatriates in Canada
French expatriates in Canada